Sarnitsa (also transcribed Surnica) is a small town in the Pazardzhik Province, southern Bulgaria.  it has 3,511 inhabitants. Formerly a village, it gained its town status in September 2003 and since January 2015 has formed the administrative centre of the homonymous Sarnitsa Municipality.

Most inhabitants are ethnic Bulgarians and their main religion is Islam. That means that Sarnitsa is a predominantly Pomak settlement. The city has an ageing age structure.

References 

Populated places in Pazardzhik Province
Towns in Bulgaria
Chech